Volar arteries may refer to:

 Common volar digital arteries 
 Deep volar branch of ulnar artery
 Proper volar digital arteries
 Superficial volar branch of radial artery
 Radial artery of index finger, also known as arteria volaris indicis radialis
 Volar carpal branch of ulnar artery
 Volar interosseous artery
 Volar metacarpal arteries